The Ketchaoua Mosque (Djamaa Ketchaoua) is a mosque in the city of Algiers, the capital of Algeria. It was built during the Ottoman rule in the 17th century and is located at the foot of the Casbah of Algiers, which is a UNESCO World Heritage Site. The mosque stands on the first of the Casbah's many steep stairways and was logistically and symbolically the cynosure of the pre-colonial city of Algiers. The mosque is noted for its unique fusion of Moorish and Byzantine architecture.

The mosque was originally built in 1612. Later, in 1845, it was converted during French rule, to the Cathedral of St Philippe, which remained so until 1962. The old mosque was demolished between 1845 and 1860 and a new church was built. It was converted into a mosque in 1962. In spite of these transitions over two different religious faiths in roughly the last four centuries, the mosque has retained its original grandeur and is one of the major attractions of Algiers.

Geography
Ketchaoua Mosque is located in the historic Casbah in Algiers, which is located in the southern part of the city. It is located approximately 250 metres east of the Djamaa el Kebir mosque, located near the Archbishop's Palace of Algiers and the National Library of Algeria. The mosque, built during the rule of the Ottoman Empire, was once at the centre of the city. Its strategic location, standing on the first of the Casbah's stairways which led to the five gates of the city in the aristocratic district where lived the rich and the famous royal family members of the Ottoman Regency, political prominence, and other rich business magnates. It was built on the site of an Icosium; the original Phoenician settlement existed at the site of the mosque in the past.

History
The Casbah (means fortress), next to the Mediterranean Sea shore, is a unique kind of medina, or Islamic city, which preceded the construction of the Ketchaoua Mosque at its centre. It overlooks the islands where a Carthaginian trading-post was established in the 6th century BC but the city of Algiers was only founded in the 10th century by the Zirids; over the next several centuries successive rule under the Berbers, Romans, Byzantines, Arabs and Spaniards left their impact. 

The history of the Ketchaoua Mosque is integral to the ancient history of the Casbah, which is recognized under the UNESCO World Heritage List for its cultural heritage. The mosque was built under the Ottoman Rule (16th and 17th centuries) at the centre of the Casbah. Its exact location was at the centre of the city at the intersection of the roads from the lower Casbah leading to the five gates of the Algiers city. An unconfirmed mention is made of the mosque in the 14th century, but the confirmed "notarial document" dates it to 1612. However, it was rebuilt by Hasan Pasha according to a commemorative inscription in the later part of the 18th century, when it was glorified as a structure of "unparalleled beauty.” In 1832, the mosque was converted into a cathedral named "St. Philippe Cathedral" by the French. In 1838, following the conquest of the Algerian city of Constantine by the France, Marshal Sylvain Charles Valée had  a cross fixed on top of the cathedral. Between 1845 and 1860 the old mosque was demolished and a new church was built. After the liberation of Algeria from French rule, the cathedral's restitution as the Ketchaoua Mosque in 1962 is considered as "having significant religious and cultural importance," and it richly testifies to the history of "this mosque-turned-cathedral-turned-mosque". The rededication of the cathedral into a mosque was performed in the first year after the Algerian independence, in a formal ceremony presided over by Tawfiq al Madani, the Minister of Harbours, held at the Ben Badis Square (earlier known as Lavigere). This event has also been described as "correlatively for the reconquest of Algeria’s authenticity as a supreme symbol of the nation’s recovery of its integrity."

Apart from the Ketchaoua Mosque, there are remains of the citadel, other old mosques and Ottoman-style palaces, as well as the remains of a traditional urban structure.

Architecture

The principal entrance to the mosque is through a flight of 23 steps. At the entrance, there is an ornamented portico, which is supported by four black-veined marble columns. Inside the mosque, there are arcades built with white marble columns. The beauty of the mosque's chambers, minarets and ceilings are accentuated by the distinctly Moorish plaster work. The mosque overlooks the public square in the Casbah, with the sea in front; it has two octagonal minarets flanking the entrance, with Byzantine and Moorish design and decorations. Many of the white marble columns belong to the original mosque. There is a tomb with the remains of San Geronimo enshrined in one of the chambers in the mosque.

Restoration

In 2009, the Heritage Department of Algeria began improvements to the octagonal minarets, the central vault of the main fascia and the abutting staircase inside the mosque. These were planned to be completed over a 12 months schedule. With the minaret of Ketchaoua Mosque, which was on the brink of partial collapse, under restoration, plans were developed for implementation in three stages, including the restoration of the Casbah itself, in more general terms. This plan, launched in September 2008, covers the renovation of several mosques in old Algiers and the conversion of a number of houses into libraries at an initial cost of 300 million Algerian dinars.

Gallery

Notable Imams
 Mohamed Charef (1908-2011)

See also
 Algerian Islamic reference
 Hizb Rateb (Hezzab, Bash Hezzab, Salka)
 Lists of mosques
 List of mosques in Africa
 List of mosques in Algeria
 Islam in Algeria
 Dar Hassan Pacha

References

Casbah of Algiers
Mosques in Algiers
17th-century mosques
Religious buildings and structures completed in 1612
Tourist attractions in Algiers
Byzantine architecture
1612 establishments in the Ottoman Empire
1612 establishments in Africa
Ottoman Mosques in Algeria
Churches converted from mosques